Hilde Gudilla Lion (1893–1970) was a German Jewish academic and teacher of social workers who emigrated to England in 1933, after the Nazi seizure of power.  She founded Stoatley Rough School in the Quaker tradition for German refugees in 1934 and was its headmistress until 1960. Dr. Emmy Wolff became second in command at the school in 1937.

References

1893 births
1970 deaths
Jewish emigrants from Nazi Germany to the United Kingdom
Heads of schools in England
Social work education
Academic staff of the Alice Salomon University of Applied Sciences Berlin